Trond Helge Skretting (born 11 March 1959) is a former speedway rider from Norway.

Speedway career 
Skretting is a former champion of Norway, winning the Norwegian Championship in 1982.

He rode in the top tier of British Speedway in 1979 and 1981, riding for Wolverhampton Wolves and Halifax Dukes respectively.

References 

1959 births
Living people
Norwegian speedway riders
Halifax Dukes riders
Wolverhampton Wolves riders